The Mauritius Ports Authority (MPA) is a parastatal organisation in Mauritius, it is the sole regulator and manager of the port and its services.

Functions 

Formerly known as the Mauritius Marine Authority (MMA), the MPA is the sole national port authority set up under the Ports Act 1998, to regulate and control the port sectors in Mauritius and Rodrigues. The MPA is a landlord port authority, providing the main port infrastructure and superstructure, together with related facilities. It also provides marine services and navigation aids, while it regulates and controls all port activities and environmental issues within the designated port areas.

As the principal gateway of the country, Port Louis Harbour plays a vital role in the national economy by handling about 99% of the total volume of the external trade. All strategic imports such as food and petroleum products, raw materials for the textile industry, and major exports such as sugar and textile, transit through the harbour.

Over the past decades, the port has been transformed into an economic nerve centre, with modern port equipment, a dynamic Freeport, extensive port-based facilities together with an impressive waterfront and dedicated cruise facility.

The strategic objective of the Mauritius Ports Authority (MPA) is to make Port Louis and Port Mathurin Harbours well equipped, professionally managed and constantly upgraded ports in order to maintain high productivity and enhanced service levels at competitive rates. To achieve this objective, MPA will continue to pursue a policy of improvement and opening to the outside world. In the same manner, it will encourage further investment in the ports to respond to the growing needs of the shipping lines and other port stakeholders.

See also

 Port authority
 Port operator

References

External links
 Mauritius Port Authority, official site
 Government of Mauritius, Ministry of Tourism, Leisure and External Communications
 Cargo Handling Corporation of Mauritius
 Government of Mauritius, Customs and Excise Department
 Mauritius port

Government agencies of Mauritius
Government agencies established in 1998
1998 establishments in Mauritius
Water transport in Mauritius
Port authorities
Ports and harbours in Africa